The 2014 Atlantic Sun men's basketball tournament was the 36th edition of the Atlantic Sun Conference Championship. It took place from March 4 through March 9 in several arenas. All games took place at the higher seed of the two teams competing.

Format
The A-Sun Championship was a six-day single-elimination tournament. The top eight teams (with the exception of Northern Kentucky) competed in the championship. As part of their transition to Division I from Division II, Northern Kentucky will not be eligible for post-season play until 2017, including the A-Sun tournament. The winner of the tournament earned the A-Sun's automatic bid into the 2014 NCAA tournament.

The top seed was the defending champion Florida Gulf Coast University.

Seeds

Bracket

* indicates overtime period

See also
2013-14 NCAA Division I men's basketball season
Atlantic Sun men's basketball tournament

References

External links 
Atlantic Sun Men's Basketball Championship Details

ASUN men's basketball tournament
2013–14 Atlantic Sun Conference men's basketball season
Atlantic Sun men's basketball tournament
Atlantic Sun men's basketball tournament